Frank Miller (1848 – September 12, 1903) was a Union soldier, received the Medal of Honor for his capture of the flag of the 25th Battalion Virginia Infantry at the Battle of Sayler's Creek, Virginia on April 6, 1865.

Miller enlisted in the Army from Jamaica, New York in September 1864, and was mustered out in June 1865.

Medal of Honor citation

Rank and Organization:
Private, Company M, 2d New York Cavalry. Place and date: At Sailors Creek, Va., April 6, 1865. Entered service at: Jamaica, N.Y. Birth: New York. Date of issue: April 24, 1865.

Citation:
Capture of flag of 25th Battalion Virginia Infantry (C.S.A.); was taken prisoner, but successfully retained his trophy until recaptured.

See also

List of American Civil War Medal of Honor recipients: M–P

Notes

References

1848 births
1903 deaths
Union Army soldiers
United States Army Medal of Honor recipients
American Civil War recipients of the Medal of Honor
Date of birth missing